Wakefield is an unincorporated community in Richland County, Illinois, United States. Chemist Reynold C. Fuson was born near Wakefield. Wakefield was a booming community in the early 1900s. There was a grocery store, post office, garage and a church named Liberty Baptist Church.

References

Unincorporated communities in Richland County, Illinois
Unincorporated communities in Illinois